The Green brothers, John (born 1977) and Hank (born 1980), are two American entrepreneurs, social activists, authors, and YouTube vloggers. The two extensively work together, having started their collaborative popularity with a daily vlog project in 2007 titled "Brotherhood 2.0", in which they only communicated in vlogs posted to YouTube for a year. The Greens' portfolio of online work now includes their main Vlogbrothers channel, Crash Course, SciShow, their podcast Dear Hank & John, and several other projects spanning several forms of media.

Both brothers have become known for their individual projects as well. John has written several books which have received widespread acclaim and popularity, including The Fault in Our Stars. The novel was made into a 2014 film adaptation, which was number one at the box office during its opening weekend and grossed over $307 million worldwide. Hank has founded several companies, starting when he created "EcoGeek", a blog dedicated to environmentally beneficial advancements in technology. The blog was originally a class project of Hank's, while he studied at the University of Montana, but eventually progressed into becoming a major environmental publication, which would grab the attention of Time. The company has since evolved into Complexly, the parent company for most of the Green brothers' projects. Hank co-founded the record label and e-commerce merchandise company DFTBA Records with Alan Lastufka and his debut novel, An Absolutely Remarkable Thing and its sequel A Beautifully Foolish Endeavor debuted as New York Times best sellers.

Together, the two brothers are credited with creating what some have described as a "YouTube media" or "online multimedia" empire. This empire, including projects centered on education, gaming, and activism, among others, has amassed an active fanbase known as "Nerdfighteria". Other projects founded by the brothers include the online-video conference VidCon and the annual charity event Project for Awesome.

Online video and audio projects

Vlogbrothers

On January 1, 2007, after being heavily inspired by the show with zefrank, the Greens launched the Vlogbrothers channel. Another inspiration for the project was the video blog, lonelygirl15. The project was originally meant to be a year-long way to deepen the bond between the brothers, creating a new outlet to communicate to each other. Prior to the video blog, Hank claims the two, "didn't ever talk, really". The project, titled "Brotherhood 2.0", quickly grew an audience, leading to the Greens' success on YouTube. On their following, Hank has stated, "We were never really shouting into the void. There were always people following us. Even if it was just a couple dozen people, they were really engaged." The New Yorker has described the Vlogbrothers channel as "the anchor of an online empire".

The topics of videos on the channel vary widely, as the Greens speak about whatever is on their minds at the time.
The first majorly successful Vlogbrothers video, "Accio Deathly Hallows", uploaded on July 18, 2007, was a song about Harry Potter and the Deathly Hallows. The video was featured on YouTube's front page, earned over 1 million views, now has almost 2 million views, and introduced the brothers to the Harry Potter fandom. By the end of 2007, the channel garnered 40,000 subscribers. Another video, in which John announces his support for his friend, mathematician and politician, Daniel Biss, was covered by The Wall Street Journal.

The Brotherhood 2.0 project would end on December 31, 2007, but the Greens announced on their final Brotherhood 2.0 vlog, that they would continue creating videos. The channel and its fanbase would grow past Brotherhood 2.0, and eventually in 2013, it reached the 1 million subscriber threshold. The brothers have continued to work on the channel, with Hank stating, "I'm so happy that we get to keep doing vlogbrothers and that people still care about vlogbrothers", adding, "that's still the thing I do. Everything else is just an extension of that thing."

Educational channels
The Green brothers have been constantly seeking to educate their viewers on various topics. Since late 2011 and early 2012, the two have been launching and working on several educational channels. Among these channels include Crash Course, SciShow (including its Space and Psych spinoffs),  The Brain Scoop (since spun off), Sexplanations, How to Adult, and Mental Floss. In an interview with The Washington Post, John Green stated, "I think people support Crash Course and SciShow because they want for Crash Course and SciShow to exist and they believe in our mission to make educational content for free, for everyone, for ever." The brothers have been described as, "one of the main voices in YouTube's vibrant education community". These channels are operated under the company name of Complexly.

Crash Course and SciShow

Crash Course is an educational channel that was launched by Hank Green and John Green as an educational channel as part of YouTube's original channel program. Crash Course launched a preview on December 2, 2011. Initially, John presented the humanities courses, while Hank presented with the sciences, though the channel has since expanded to include other hosts such as Craig Benzine and Phil Plait. Crash Course was funded by YouTube's $100 million original channel initiative. The graphics of Crash Course videos are created by Thought Café (formerly Thought Bubble).

SciShow is a series of science-related videos on YouTube hosted by Hank and Michael Aranda, as well as other hosts. SciShow, like Crash Course, was launched as an original channel. Several scientific fields are covered by SciShow. Among these are organic and thermodynamic chemistry, physics, geology, climatology, astronomy and astrophysics, evolutionary biology, psychology and several miscellaneous fields. The topics on videos uploaded onto SciShow varied; for example, one video detailed the origins of "cute". SciShow landed a national advertisement campaign deal with YouTube, in 2014. As a result, the channel was promoted through several platforms, including billboard ads, as well as a television commercial featured during the fifth season premiere of The Walking Dead. A spin-off titled, SciShow Space, launched in 2014, dedicating itself to space related news, discoveries and space related science. Hank Green also hosts the channel, although he is joined by co-hosts Reid Reimers and Caitlin Hofmeister.

Other educational channels

Additionally, Hank Green helped Emily Graslie to launch The Brain Scoop, in early 2013. The channel focuses on taxidermy, biology, and natural history. Prior to the channel's launch, Hank Green featured Graslie giving a tour of the University of Montana's Philip L. Wright Zoological Museum on one of his Vlogbrothers videos. Green's fans positively responded to video, suggesting for Graslie to host her own channel, leading Green to e-mail Graslie with an offer to assist her in the launch of this channel. Green later announced that the channel would launch in January 2013, helping the channel to spike to 20,000 subscribers prior to its first upload. The channel would upload videos from Montana, until Graslie became employed at Chicago's Field Museum of Natural History. In December 2014, the brothers sold the channel, for an undisclosed amount, to the Chicago-based museum. Regarding this transaction, Hank stated, "We helped create The Brain Scoop with Emily and Michael Aranda of our studio because she was just so passionate and enthusiastic about science, history, and her work. I am so proud and pleased that The Brain Scoop and Emily have found what is absolutely their best possible home."

Another educational channel, Mental Floss, based on a magazine of the same name, was launched in February 2013. John would host the channel's first series, The List Show. Prior to becoming a published novelist, Green wrote for the magazine, and attended Indian Springs School with the magazine's first editor, Neely Harris. The channel's success has been described as "somewhat of an outlier in the magazine industry", by The New York Times, as videos on the channel have outgained videos on other channels launched by magazine companies, such as Wired, and Vogue. The channel later added to its library of videos, launching The Big Question, and Misconceptions hosted by Craig Benzine and Elliott Morgan, respectively. Emerson College's Entertainment Monthly paper listed Mental Floss, as well as the aforementioned Crash Course as top five educational YouTube channels.

Hank Green also serves as the executive producer for Sexplanations, a channel dedicated to open and honest conversation and information about sex-related topics hosted by clinical sexologist Lindsay Doe. It was launched in June 2013.

In February 2014, Hank and John Green announced a new channel, How to Adult. The channel is "dedicated to teaching everything you need to know how to do as an adult that school never got around to." The channel is aimed at young people who have recently entered adulthood. The channel is hosted by vlogger Emma Mills (known as "Elmify" on YouTube) and Young Adult novelist T. Michael Martin. The Greens serve as the channel's Executive Producers.

Dear Hank & John 

In June 2015, the brothers started a weekly podcast titled Dear Hank & John. Taking a mainly humorous tone, each podcast opens with John reading a poem that he selected for the week before the brothers read a series of questions submitted by listeners and offering their advice. The podcast now opens with a "dad joke" from Hank. The podcast closes with a news segment with two standard topics: Mars, presented by Hank, and AFC Wimbledon, presented by John. On a number of occasions, one of the brothers was absent from a number of episodes (for example, during the publicity tours for Paper Towns, Turtles All The Way Down, and An Absolutely Remarkable Thing); various friends and family members of the brothers filled in on those occasions.

Other online projects 
Aside from the aforementioned projects, the Greens also created a sub-project of Vlogbrothers called Truth or Fail, an interactive game show on YouTube. The game is often themed, and consists of five rounds of two statements each, relating to the theme, with one statement being true, and the other being false.

Hank also launched a gaming channel, Hankgames. It featured Hank, his wife Katherine, John, and occasionally Charlie McDonnell and Michael Aranda playing video games such as Minecraft, New Super Mario Bros. Wii, and FIFA 11. Eventually, the channel's videos were predominantly uploaded by John to a point where Hank decided to create another gaming channel, called "Games With Hank", in 2014. However, the "hankgames" channel is still being used by John, as he continues to upload commentary over his FIFA gameplay. John's devotion for both the video game series and English football has led to Nerdfighteria being an official sponsor of the real football club, AFC Wimbledon.

More successfully, the Green Brothers have helped launch modernized adaptations of classic novels. The production company behind these is Pemberley Digital, which according to Hank Green's Reddit userpage, he helped co-create.

The first of these adaptations was The Lizzie Bennet Diaries on YouTube in early 2012. The Lizzie Bennet Diaries was a web series adaptation of Jane Austen's novel, Pride and Prejudice. In 2013, The Lizzie Bennet Diaries won an Emmy Award for Original Interactive Program. Following the conclusion of the series, Emma Approved, a web series adaptation of Emma, another Austen novel, was launched in October 2013. In 2014, Pemberley Digital launched Frankenstein, MD, an adaptation of Mary Shelley's novel, Frankenstein, in collaboration with PBS Digital Studios.

In 2014, The Art Assignment was launched by PBS Digital Studios, featuring John's wife, Sarah Urist Green. John serves as an executive producer for the series.

Business ventures and philanthropy

Complexly

Complexly LLC is an online video and audio production company, based in Missoula, Montana, and Indianapolis, Indiana. The brothers were previously co-CEOs, though Hank is now the sole CEO and John acts as the cofounder and strategic advisor. In 2012, the Greens began producing educational video content with the YouTube channels Crash Course and SciShow, and in the years since have created many other channels and podcasts which have been folded into the company. Originally named EcoGeek LLC, it was founded by Hank Green to support his blog on environmental and science issues and was renamed in 2016. Also associated with Complexly's business, but separate to its operation, are VidCon, DFTBA Records, and the Project for Awesome. The business affairs of the Greens' personal projects, such as the YouTube channel Vlogbrothers, are handled by Complexly but the company does not directly produce their content. The company's strengths in educational content has led to them being approached by institutions like PBS and the Poetry Foundation to co-produce content. In November 2018, Complexly fully launched a co-production arrangement with WNYC Studios for three regular podcasts; two had been produced independently before, one was new (but adapted from an old format). Two years later the co-production was ended, and Complexly now produces the shows on its own.

VidCon

In 2010, VidCon was launched by the brothers. Since its launch, VidCon has annually increased its attendance to become the largest in-person gathering of online video creators, viewers, and representatives. On VidCon's purpose, Hank Green stated "Even when VidCon was just 1,000 people in a hotel, it was our goal for the conference to reflect the growth and culture of the online video industry", later adding, "VidCon's exponential growth over the last four years is indicative of online video's impact on the entertainment industry and on our everyday lives." One Nerdfighter has described their experience of VidCon stating, "it's just a three-day conference with just all nerdfighters and YouTubers. It's an incredible community, and the first year, which was in 2010 ... I went and it was just the most overwhelming thing I've ever experienced, and I made a bunch of friends who I'm still friends with today."

DFTBA Records

In 2008, Hank Green and fellow musician, Alan Lastufka, founded DFTBA Records. The distribution of merchandise is largely independent. In 2009, the record label caught the attention of YouTube, who praised the label on its official blog. DFTBA Records launched a series called The Warehouse on its YouTube channel, where it documents new products and announces events. DFTBA Records' merchandise extends past music, and includes merchandise such as T-shirts and posters.

In March 2014, several artists and creators signed under DFTBA Records were at the center of controversial sexual abuse cases. These artists were dropped from the label, and both Hank and John responded to these circumstances, and began working with a group of Nerdfighters, including "survivors of sexual abuse", to begin a "task force against abuse and assault". Additionally, Hank posted a video onto the Vlogbrothers channel, and in it, he discussed sexual abuse, sexual consent, as well as the culture surrounding sexual activities.

In June 2014, Lastufka announced that would be selling his entire stake in DFTBA Records, and resigning as the label's president, to pursue other projects. During an interview, Lastufka stated "Over the last few years I worked on the big ideas or product designs less and less, as my position transformed into brokering deals with brick and mortar stores and meeting with cart developers", and added "I would get a little jealous when art assignments that once went to me by default were being hired out because I just didn't have the time."

Subbable
On July 26, 2013, Hank Green made a video announcing the introduction of Subbable, a crowdfunding system to support various web series (both entertainment- and education-oriented). Users subscribe to creators and decide how much they want to pay to receive their content on either a recurring basis or with a one-time donation. The money that users spend to support various projects goes into a "perk bank" and can be redeemed for creator-determined perks such as signed posters or shoutouts in videos. The money that users donate goes immediately and directly to each creator, minus five percent of revenue that goes to Subbable itself to pay for overhead and server costs and roughly five percent that goes to Amazon to process payments. Subbable was originally created as a crowdfunding system to continue the production of CrashCourse at the termination of the two-year Google grant that funded the project. Additionally, Subbable presents a $0 subscription option, offering the subscriber access to special emails, behind the scenes videos and live shows.

Hank, who has been described as "idealistic" for the idea, explained that donations to projects on Subbable are voluntary, stating in his video, "We're asking, and this is weird, for you to pay for content because you want to, not because you're forced to. This is a weird cultural shift." John emphasized the point of the crowdfunding system's voluntary nature, "If you're authentic toward your community and don't focus on the ads, your audience will support you."

In March 2015, Subbable was acquired by Patreon. As part of the deal with Patreon, all 24 content creators signed to Subbable switched over to Patreon, and John joined Patreon as an advisor. Prior to the deal, Hank was already on the Patreon team as an advisor.

Project for Awesome 

In December 2007, the two launched Project for Awesome, a charitable movement driven by the YouTube community. Legally, Project for Awesome is a project of the Greens' Montana-based charitable organization, the Foundation to Decrease World Suck, Inc. The most recent event occurred in 2023. The 2014 event raised over $1 million, and may have been responsible for the IndieGoGo site-wide crash which occurred just as they broke the million-dollar threshold. The project has donated to a variety of charity organizations. During the project's first year, Hank Green stated, "There were more than 400 videos posted, but several people focused on humanitarian organizations in Darfur, UNICEF, Autism Speaks, The Humane Society, Toys for Tots, World Wildlife Fund, I'm proud to say that it's a very long list."

Subscription services
In November 2020, the brothers started the Awesome Socks Club, a monthly subscription service where members receive a pair of socks designed by independent artists. All post-tax profits are donated to the charity Partners in Health, in a business model similar to Newman's Own products. As of March 2022, the Awesome Socks Club had 45,000 members.

In March 2022, the brothers started the Awesome Coffee Club, with an identical business model and goal to the Awesome Socks Club. The coffee is ethically sourced from Colombia via the brothers' sourcing partner Sucafina. The beans are then roasted in St. Louis, Missouri, and distributed through DFTBA's fulfillment center in Missoula, Montana.

Views
The Green brothers have discussed several educational, political, philosophical, and moral topics in their videos. Speaking about what subjects he would like to teach on the Crash Course channel, John stated, "I'm very interested in economics and personal finance (I sometimes post at r/personalfinance) and literature and philosophy and anthropology and the list goes on and on." Both Hank and John have been referred to as philosophers of sorts. Additionally, the Greens have been described as "charismatic, real, charmingly nerdy, and unquestionably talented", as well as "funny – an insightful, inclusive, not mean kind of funny", by The Wire, a sister site of The Atlantic. In their youth, the Greens' parents encouraged the brothers to discuss big issues at the dinner table, and John often argued about philosophy and ethics.

Online video
Both John and Hank have expressed their liking for online video as a platform and culture. Their careers are heavily invested upon online video, and in 2010, they founded the aforementioned VidCon. Hank and John founded the event, believing that somebody else would do so eventually, and that video blogging was becoming more of an industry. Hank has been documented to be active in the crowdfunding field, and would establish Subbable, allowing online content creators to have an alternative funding source aside from video advertising.

In a 2015 speech spoken to advertising executives at YouTube's Brandcast event, John stated, "I and the most passionate creators on YouTube ... we're not in the distraction business. We're in the community business, and number of eyeballs is a terrible metric for my business." John elaborated on his valuing of engagement and connection over raw viewing numbers stating, "I don't care how many people watch or read something I make. I care how many people love what I make."

Religion

The Green brothers have discussed religion in their videos. However, in one video, John states that religion is a, "topic we've been reluctant to discuss over the years, mostly because the quality of discourse about religion on the internet is atrocious."

On his website, John writes that he is a Christian, introducing a blog post with, "I don't talk about it very often, but I'm a religious person. In fact, before I became a writer, I wanted to be a minister. There is a certain branch of Christianity that has so effectively hijacked the word 'Christian' that I feel uncomfortable sometimes using it to describe myself. But I am a Christian." Green has also stated, in an interview, that he belongs to the Episcopal Church. At the same time, John disagrees with the notion that creationism should be brought back into schools' educational curriculums, stating, "What science has taught us does not invalidate religious faith, and to those evangelical Christians who believe otherwise, I would respectfully say that you are placing too much faith in the power of science." Green adds, "Science has given so much to the experience of being a creature on this planet. But it does not render our spiritual lives irrelevant." Additionally, John, has stated, "Ultimately, there are Muslims who I have more theologically in common with than many of my fellow Christians." Early in his YouTube career, John made jokes about Young Earth creationism, which offended some viewers. Although he stood by his pro-evolution beliefs, he also apologized for his comments, stating, "It's a privilege to have a platform to talk about things you care about, but it's an irrevocable privilege. I try to take it seriously", adding, "It's wrong to make people feel other and separate."

Hank, too, has been reluctant to discuss his religion. In 2011, he responded to his reluctance to answer questions regarding his religion, stating, "People are asking, because they want to inform their opinions of me with this little one word answer that says so very little about who I actually am." Later in 2016, during a podcast, Hank expressed, "I'm so jealous of religious people, man. They just know what to do."

Existentialism and human complexity

The Greens have often discussed the topic of existential anxiety and an existential crisis. John, in particular, has included themes of existentialism in his novels, notably, The Fault in Our Stars. The two main characters of the novel, Hazel and Augustus, bond over existentialism and philosophy. Another theme in Green's works, including The Fault in Our Stars, is the complex imagination of others. Green has commented on the character of aforementioned Nerdfighter, Esther Earl, stating she, "had a wonderful gift for imagining others and for imagining them very complexly". Green incorporated this aspect of Earl's personality into the novel. Additionally, Green has stated, "while the world talks about young people's insularity and solipsism, they're creating a fascinating and complex world of deep engagement online, a world in which they are not just watching content but becoming part of it by being community members whose comments and fanfiction and artwork and passion have profound impacts on the broader culture."

Hank has spoken about human dreams of success. On the topic, Hank has stated, "There are problems with the institutions of dreams, [but] I am in favor of them. We need something to push us to work 16-hour days sometimes. We need something to drive us to be better, and weirder, and different, but I think if we let that one thing drive us, it's a failure of imagination, and we miss opportunities." Hank would add, "In the end, it's not about finding success, it's about building the number of things you're capable of, because then you could do more interesting things, and we need people to do interesting things in the world."

Politics

Both John and Hank have often discussed political and governmental topics in their videos. Hank, in particular, is a strong advocate of young Americans taking advantage of their right to vote. John has also advocated for this, and has written that for years after he turned 18, he did not participate in voting. During this period, John "found politics boring and divisive", believing that politics and voting were a waste of his time. Green adds to this, stating, "I was going to be a writer, and the great writers (I thought) transcend the minor quibbles of their historical moments. Writers focus on the big questions; politics, I thought, is about the small questions." However, as Green matured during his adult years, he has developed a belief that, "the big questions—about our environment, our responsibilities to one another, our rights as citizens—are political questions." In 2016, while speaking on the SourceFed Podcast, Hank expressed that he has become "less liberal".

John has stated that he is an independent voter who has voted for both Republican and Democratic politicians. Additionally, the Greens once created a YouTube channel, registered under the username, obamasidiots. Although, as John stated, "the project went nowhere", the channel was created to raise money for Barack Obama's 2008 presidential campaign.

In 2015, Hank, along with fellow online media personalities, GloZell and Bethany Mota, conducted personal interviews with United States President Barack Obama, following the 2015 State of the Union Address. Though the approach was somewhat different from previous years, having the three conduct interviews continued the White House's efforts to "speak directly to the American people online". Some of the questions Green and his fellow online personalities asked were collected from social media input. CNN's Senior White House correspondent, Jim Acosta was critical of the decision to have Obama be interviewed by the media personalities. Acosta stated, "None of them are professional journalists. They're people who post videos on YouTube", sarcastically adding, "I'm just curious: Was 'Charlie Bit My Finger' or 'David After Dentist' not available?" In response to Acosta, Hank tweeted, "I think sometimes we need to think about how to involve people who are not reached by legacy media in the conversation. That's all." Acosta subsequently replied, "No sense of humor @hankgreen? Totally agree. Good luck." John then defended Hank via a Tumblr post. Coincidentally, John had previously participated in a Fireside Hangout on Google+ with Obama, with the President even reciting the commonly used phrase by Nerdfighters, "Don't forget to be awesome", to conclude one of his answers to John's questions.

Gender and sexual orientation
Hank and John Green are supporters of LGBT rights. Arguing against those who say homosexuality is unnatural, Hank Green states that, "the most natural thing in the world is complexity, and gender, and sexual orientation are proven over and over again to not be firm lines." Hank adds, "To me, there's only one argument that matters for gay marriage: That all people in our country should be seen as equals in the eyes of the law." After receiving high ratings on his vlog centered on same-sex marriage, Hank stated, "It's stuff like that where I feel like we're making the world a better place, and resonating with how people feel about new cultural ideas, and really being a part of the cultural evolution toward a better way of understanding each other and the world."

In 2009, John posted a video, expressing his frustrations with the usage of the word gay as an insult. The word was being used to describe John, despite the fact that, at the time, it was already known that he was married to a woman. In the video, John stated, "Ultimately, gay will never work as an insult, because it's not bad."

When asked by a Reddit user whether he identifies as a feminist, John Green replying with an anecdote from his childhood, "Yes, I do. My hardcore badass feminist mom told both my brother and me that we were feminists from the time we were like two years old, so if she ever heard me saying I wasn't a feminist she'd fly to my house and smack me upside the head."

Impact
The Green brothers' projects have had varying effects on the YouTube community, nerd culture, young-adult fiction, and other fields. One such effect is that of the Green brothers' fanbase, Nerdfighteria, which has been utilized to accomplish charitable actions. Aside from charity, however, several Nerdfighter clubs have been launched as an extracurricular activity at universities such as the University of Maryland and Auburn University. Nerdfighters use the collaborative nature of Nerdfighteria to schedule offline meetups, which on occasion, include the Greens themselves. The New Yorker has described the community as "strikingly civil and constructive for an Internet subculture".

The Greens have also influenced online videos, prompting individuals to create their own vlogs. Additionally, Hank has stated "We really believed in the importance of online video as a cultural form."

Another influence is that of John's novels, which are of the young adult fiction genre. In 2013, A. J. Jacobs of The New York Times reviewed Winger by Andrew Smith. In the review, Jacobs coined the term GreenLit, a play on John's surname, Green and the word literature, to describe "realistic stories told by a funny, self-aware teenage narrator", that include, "sharp dialogue, defective authority figures, occasional boozing, unrequited crushes and one or more heartbreaking twists". The Wall Street Journal also noted "The John Green bump", an effect which includes "a blurb or Twitter endorsement from Mr. Green", that, "can ricochet around the Internet and boost sales". The term has been criticized by Green himself, as he disagrees with the concept that he is singlehandedly responsible for launching any one individual's career, or propelling an individual to success.

Nonetheless, Green's novels have been successful, leading him to be included on Time 2014 "100 Most Influential People" list. Shailene Woodley, who portrayed the main character of The Fault in Our Stars, Hazel Grace Lancaster, in the novel's film adaptation, wrote the piece on Time list for Green, describing him as a "teen whisperer" and saying, "He acknowledges the intelligence and vulnerability that stem from those beautiful years when we are, for the first time, discovering the world and ourselves outside of our familial stories. But he doesn't just listen to young adults. He treats every human he meets as their own planet, rather than simply one of his moons."

Community

The Green brothers' videos have been able to connect with their viewers, which are individually referred to as "Nerdfighters", and collectively referred to as "Nerdfighteria". Activities, events, and community symbols and terminology have been noted by various media outlets. Nerdfighters have adopted the initialism "DFTBA", standing for Don't forget to be awesome, as their slogan. The community has also developed a hand sign, which is similar to the Vulcan salute seen in Star Trek. Hank describes the community as "people who are pro-nerd: They fight for nerd culture, to celebrate intellectualism, to find and build spaces on the Internet that are devoted to engagement and meaningful conversation instead of distraction and echo-chambery conversations."
 
The Greens and Nerdfighters collaborate on various charitable endeavors, which the fanbase refers to as "decreasing" or "fighting world suck". Charitable events conducted by Nerdfighters include the aforementioned Project for Awesome, as well as loaning funds through Kiva.org, to entrepreneurs in developing nations. Additionally, a charity foundation, This Star Won't Go Out (TSWGO), was founded by Wayne and Lori Earl, the parents of Esther Earl.

Esther was an active member of Nerdfighteria, as well as an associated group, the Harry Potter Alliance (HPA), who died of thyroid cancer in 2010. Earl is an influential Nerdfighter, having started the Esther Day celebration, which has been described by HPA founder Andrew Slack, as "the first baggage-free holiday about love and gratitude". Another member of the community, Rosianna Halse Rojas, whom The New Yorker describes as a "pioneering nerdfighter", has the position of being John's personal assistant. However, John describes her as more than a PA, citing that, "she does many things—from project management to helping shape the strategic direction of our educational and charity projects." Daniel Biss, who serves as a member of the Illinois Senate's 9th district, has been referred to by John as, "Brotherhood 2.0's Resident Mathematician", and is also a member of the community. Additionally, Biss designed the mathematics formulas for John's novel, An Abundance of Katherines. Celebrities, including British actor Benedict Cumberbatch, and American rapper Lupe Fiasco, who has compared Crash Course to crack, have also been documented as Nerdfighters.

References

 
1977 births
1980 births
American businesspeople in the online media industry
American educators
American podcasters
American social activists
American YouTubers
Charity fundraisers (people)
Educational and science YouTubers
Internet activists
Living people
Nerd culture
People from Orlando, Florida
Sibling duos
YouTube podcasters
YouTube vloggers